If We Fall in Love Tonight is an album released by Rod Stewart on 12 November 1996. It includes mostly previously released songs.  The album was released in both the US and UK, though the versions differ slightly.  It was released by Warner Bros. Records, and produced the singles "If We Fall in Love Tonight" and "When I Need You".

Background
The title track "If We Fall in Love Tonight", written for this album, had some legal wrangles regarding its copyright and track title which have now been resolved. The album also includes another original recording, "For the First Time", which was an Adult Contemporary hit for Kenny Loggins after it was included in the soundtrack for the film One Fine Day. The album includes two newly recorded cover versions of hit songs: "Sometimes When We Touch", originally by Dan Hill and "When I Need You", originally by Albert Hammond and a hit for Leo Sayer a few months later. Two other songs had not been previously released on a Rod Stewart album: "So Far Away", originally by Carole King, which had been released as a single in 1995 from that year's Carole King tribute album, Tapestry Revisited, and "All for Love", a collaboration with Bryan Adams and Sting, from the 1993 film soundtrack The Three Musketeers. Additionally, two songs were revamped for If We Fall in Love Tonight: "Have I Told You Lately", originally by Van Morrison and initially released on Stewart's Vagabond Heart, was remixed here; and "Forever Young", initially on Stewart's Out of Order, which was completely re-recorded. The remaining tracks were all previously released on various Rod Stewart albums.

Track listing

International release
"If We Fall in Love Tonight" – 5:39
"For the First Time" – 4:01
"When I Need You" – 4:50
"Sometimes When We Touch" – 4:20
"Tonight's the Night (Gonna Be Alright)" – 3:33
"I Don't Want to Talk About It (1989)" – 4:50
"Have I Told You Lately (Studio Remix Version)" – 3:58
"Broken Arrow" – 4:21
"Forever Young (1996)" – 4:52
"You're in My Heart (The Final Acclaim)" – 4:28
"My Heart Can't Tell You No" – 5:16
"The First Cut Is the Deepest" – 3:50
"Sailing" – 4:38
"Downtown Train" – 4:40
"Tom Traubert's Blues (Waltzing Matilda)" (previously released on Stewart's Lead Vocalist) – 6:10
"All for Love" (with Bryan Adams & Sting) – 4:41

Notes
  signifies a remixer
  signifies a co-producer
 The Japanese release replaces track 8, "Broken Arrow", with "Your Song" from the Elton John tribute album Two Rooms. The remaining track list is otherwise identical.  On some releases, "Sailing" is replaced by "This".

Production
Mastered by Doug Sax
Compilation and Mastering Advisor: Bill Schnee
Photography: Ken Schles and Randee St. Nicholas
Art Direction and Design: Stephen Walker
Management: Arnold Stiefel and Annie Challis
"If We Fall in Love Tonight" and "When I Need You" produced by Jimmy Jam and Terry Lewis
"For the First Time" and "Sometimes When We Touch" produced by James Newton-Howard
"So Far Away" produced by David Foster
"Have I Told You Lately" produced by Rod Stewart & Bernard Edwards; Remixed by Steve MacMillan
"Forever Young" produced by Kevin Savigar
"All for Love" produced by Chris Thomas, Bryan Adams, and David Nicholas

Charts

Weekly charts

Year-end charts

Certifications

References

 

Rod Stewart albums
Albums produced by Bernard Edwards
Albums produced by Chris Thomas (record producer)
1996 compilation albums
Warner Records compilation albums